Göksel Gümüşdağ (born 10 October 1972) is a Turkish businessman, former president of İstanbul Başakşehir and former vice-president of the Turkish Football Federation. He is the chair of the board of directors of LTD.

Gümüşdağ was born in Istanbul on 10 October 1972. He graduated from Anadolu University Economics and Istanbul Bilgi University Business Administration Department. In 2014, he was elected president of Istanbul Başakşehir from Süper League teams. He is still a member of the Istanbul Bilgi University Board of Trustees. He was the President of the Clubs Association Foundation between 2014–2017.

References

Living people
1972 births
Turkish businesspeople
Anadolu University alumni
Istanbul Bilgi University alumni
Turkish football chairmen and investors